Panaitoliko is a mountain range in the northeastern part of Aetolia-Acarnania and southwestern Evrytania, in western Greece. Its highest summit, Katelanos, is the highest point of Aetolia-Acarnania at 1,924 m. Its length is approximately 25 km long from east to west and its width is approximately 15 km wide. The nearest mountains are Kaliakouda to the northeast, the mountains of Nafpaktia to the southeast and Valtou to the northwest. Lake Trichonida lies to the south. The Panaitoliko extends from the Acheloos valley in the northwest to the Evinos valley in the east. There are forests in the lower areas, and grasslands in the higher elevations.

The municipal unit of Panaitoliko took its name from this mountain range. Villages near the Panaitoliko include Prousos in the north, Mesokomi in the northeast, Amvrakia in the southeast, Skoutera in the southwest and Agios Vlasios in the northwest.

References

Landforms of Aetolia-Acarnania
Mountain ranges of Greece
Landforms of Western Greece
Landforms of Evrytania
Landforms of Central Greece